Sosnovka is a rural locality (a settlement) and the administrative center of Sosnovskoye Rural Settlement, Vologodsky District, Vologda Oblast, Russia. The population was 2,311 as of 2002. There are 33 streets.

Geography 
Sosnovka is located 20 km southwest of Vologda (the district's administrative centre) by road. Isakovo is the nearest rural locality.

References 

Rural localities in Vologodsky District